Apt. (short for apartment) is the fifth album by Chilean singer Nicole. It was released in July, 2006, but was reformed in November, 2007. Her genre consists of electropop, poprock, and pop.

Track listing

 "Si Vienes Por Mi" – 3:17
 "Culpables" – 4:16
 "Bipolar" – 2:40
 "La Última Vez" – 3:22
 "No Me Confundas" – 3:31
 "1-800-Nasty-Show" – 3:18
 "Veneno" – 2:55
 "Trapped In Time" – 3:39
 "El Camino" – 3:24
 "Rapture" – 4:26
 "Veneno" (Portuguese version) – 2:58
 "Lágrimas De Sal" (acoustic version) - 4:13

References

External links 

2006 albums
Nicole (Chilean singer) albums